John Lambert Gibson (7 March 1906 – 17 December 1986) was an independent member of the House of Commons of Canada. He was a logger and lumber merchant by career.

Gibson was born in Vancouver, British Columbia. With his brother, Gordon Gibson, Sr., he was involved with the logging-based company Gibson Brothers Industries. John Gibson served as the company's president at one point.

He was first elected to Parliament at the Comox—Alberni riding in the 1945 general election at which he was classified as an Independent Liberal. He was re-elected for a second term in 1949 as a purely independent member. Gibson left federal office in 1953 and returned to Gibson Brothers Industries.

Gibson died on 17 December 1986 at Vancouver, aged 80.

References

External links
 

1906 births
1986 deaths
Canadian chief executives
Independent Liberal MPs in Canada
Independent MPs in the Canadian House of Commons
Members of the House of Commons of Canada from British Columbia
Politicians from Vancouver